The 2015 Meridian Canadian Open was held from December 8 to 13 at the Gallagher Centre in Yorkton, Saskatchewan. The Canadian Open was the fourth Grand Slam of the 2015–16 curling season.

On the women's side, the Rachel Homan rink from Ottawa continued their dominance, winning their third straight Slam, defeating the Olympic champion Jennifer Jones rink of Winnipeg in the final, 8-7.

On the men's side, the John Epping rink of Toronto won their first career slam as a team (Epping's third), defeating 2006 Olympic champion Brad Gushue of St. John's, Newfoundland and Labrador 7-4.

Men

Teams

Knockout Draw Brackets
The draw is listed as follows:

A event

B event

C event

Knockout results

Draw 1
Tuesday, December 8, 7:00 pm

Draw 3
Wednesday, December 9, 11:00 am

Draw 5
Wednesday, December 9, 6:30 pm

Draw 7
Thursday, December 10, 11:00 am

Draw 9
Thursday, December 10, 6:30 pm

Draw 10
Friday, December 11, 8:00 am

Draw 11
Friday, December 11, 11:00 am

Draw 12
Friday, December 11, 2:30 pm

Draw 13
Friday, December 11, 6:00 pm

Draw 14
Saturday, December 12, 7:30 am

Playoffs

Quarterfinals
Saturday, December 12, 2:30 pm

Semifinals
Saturday, December 12, 6:30 pm

Final
Sunday, December 13, 2:30 pm

Women

Teams

Knockout Draw Brackets
The draw is listed as follows:

A event

B event

C event

Knockout results

Draw 1
Tuesday, December 8, 7:00 pm

Draw 2
Wednesday, December 9, 8:00 am

Draw 4
Wednesday, December 9, 2:30 pm

Draw 6
Thursday, December 10, 8:00 am

Draw 8
Thursday, December 10, 2:30 pm

Draw 10
Friday, December 11, 8:00 am

Draw 11
Friday, December 11, 11:00 am

Draw 12
Friday, December 11, 2:30 pm

Draw 13
Friday, December 11, 6:00 pm

Playoffs

Quarterfinals
Saturday, December 12, 11:00 am

Semifinals
Saturday, December 12, 6:30 pm

Final
Sunday, December 13, 11:00 am

References

External links

2015 in Canadian curling
2015
Sport in Yorkton
Curling in Saskatchewan
2015 in Saskatchewan
December 2015 sports events in Canada